Chilika is a Vidhan Sabha constituency of Khordha district, Odisha, India.

This constituency includes Banapur, Balugaon, Chilika block and Banapur block.

Elected Members

Nine elections were held between 1977 and 2014.
Elected members from the Chilika constituency are:

2019: (118): Prasanta Kumar Jagadev (BJD)
2014: (118): Bibhuti Bhusan Harichandan   (BJP)
2009: (118): Raghunath Sahu (BJD) 
2004: (58): Bibhuti Bhusan Harichandan   (BJP)
2000: (58): Bibhuti Bhusan Harichandan (BJP)
1995: (58): Debendra Nath Mansingh  (Congress) 
1990: (58): Biswa Bhusan Harichandan (Janata Dal)
1985: (58): Debendra Nath Mansingh (Congress)
1980: (58): Debendra Nath Mansingh (Congress-I)
1977: (58): Biswa Bhusan Harichandan (Janata Party)

2019 Election Result

2014 Election Result

2009 Election Results
In 2009 election, Bharatiya Janata Party candidate Bibhuti Bhusan Harichandan defeated Biju Janta Dal candidate Raghu NAth Sahu by a margin of 3,066 votes.

Notes

References

Assembly constituencies of Odisha
Khordha district